The 1979 Boston Red Sox season was the 79th season in the franchise's Major League Baseball history. The Red Sox finished third in the American League East with a record of 91 wins and 69 losses,  games behind the Baltimore Orioles, who went on to win the AL championship.

Regular season 

The Red Sox only played 160 games, as a home game scheduled against the Milwaukee Brewers on August 12, and an away game scheduled against the Chicago White Sox on August 29, were rained out and not rescheduled.

Highlights
Fred Lynn had a league-leading .333 batting average and had 39 home runs and 122 RBIs, while Jim Rice batted .325 with 39 homers and 130 RBIs. On the pitching staff, Dennis Eckersley was 17–10, down from 20–8 the prior season, and Mike Torrez was 16–13, matching his record of the previous year.

The season also featured Carl Yastrzemski's 3,000th hit and his 400th home run. His 400th home run came off of Mike Morgan of the Athletics on July 24. Yaz became the seventh AL player and 18th MLB player to collect 400 home runs. He joined the 3,000 hit club with a single off of Jim Beattie of the Yankees on September 12. Yaz was the 15th player to collect 3,000 major league hits, and the first AL player to have both 3,000 hits and 400 home runs.

Season standings

Record vs. opponents

Notable transactions 
 June 13, 1979: Pete Ladd, a player to be named later, and cash were traded by the Red Sox to the Houston Astros for Bob Watson. The Red Sox completed the deal by sending Bobby Sprowl to the Astros on June 19.
 August 17, 1979: The Red Sox traded a player to be named later and cash to the Chicago Cubs for Ted Sizemore. The Red Sox completed the deal by sending Mike O'Berry to the Cubs on October 23.

Opening Day lineup 

Source:

Roster

Player stats

Batting

Starters by position 
Note: Pos = Position; G = Games played; AB = At bats; H = Hits; Avg. = Batting average; HR = Home runs; RBI = Runs batted in

Other batters 
Note: G = Games played; AB = At bats; H = Hits; Avg. = Batting average; HR = Home runs; RBI = Runs batted in

Pitching

Starting pitchers 
Note: G = Games pitched; IP = Innings pitched; W = Wins; L = Losses; ERA = Earned run average; SO = Strikeouts

Other pitchers 
Note: G = Games pitched; IP = Innings pitched; W = Wins; L = Losses; ERA = Earned run average; SO = Strikeouts

Relief pitchers 
Note: G = Games pitched; W = Wins; L = Losses; SV = Saves; ERA = Earned run average; SO = Strikeouts

Awards and honors 
 Rick Burleson – Gold Glove Award (SS)
 Dwight Evans – Gold Glove Award (OF)
 Fred Lynn – Gold Glove Award (OF), AL Player of the Month (August)

All-Star Game
 Rick Burleson, reserve SS
 Fred Lynn, starting CF
 Jim Rice, starting RF
 Bob Stanley, reserve P
 Carl Yastrzemski, starting 1B

Farm system 

LEAGUE CHAMPIONS: Winston-Salem, Winter Haven

Source:

References

External links 
1979 Boston Red Sox team page at Baseball Reference
1979 Boston Red Sox season at baseball-almanac.com

Boston Red Sox seasons
Boston Red Sox
Boston Red Sox
Red Sox